The 2007 FIM World Supercross GP season is a multi race tournament over a season for supercross. The season started on 2 December 2006 and will last until 5 May 2007. The competition is organised by the FIM.

Calendar

Overall Results

External links
 Official website

Supercross
Motorsport competitions in the United States
Motorsport competitions in Canada
2007 in Canadian motorsport
2007 in American motorsport